Lieutenant General Michael George Henry Barker   (15 October 1884 – 21 May 1960) was a British Army officer who fought in both world wars, notably as commander of I Corps during the Battle of France in May 1940.

Early life and military career
Michael Barker was born on 15 October 1884 in Wells, Somerset. He joined the British Army as a second lieutenant in the 4th (Militia) Battalion, East Surrey Regiment on 28 February 1902, and served with this battalion in South Africa during the Second Boer War, returning home in October 1902. After his return, he took a regular commission in the Lincolnshire Regiment in 1903. He served throughout World War I with the Lincolnshire Regiment and was awarded the Distinguished Service Order (DSO) in 1917, ending the war the following year as a lieutenant colonel.

Between the wars
Soon after the end of the war he attended the Staff College, Camberley, and later commanded the 2nd Battalion, York and Lancaster Regiment from 1927 to 1931 before being promoted to brigadier as a staff officer at Eastern Command. He became Director of Recruiting and Organization at the War Office in 1936 and British Forces in Palestine and Trans-Jordan in 1939, during the final stages of the Arab revolt in Palestine.

World War II

During World War II he served as commander of I Corps from April 1940, before being replaced during the latter stages of the Battle of Dunkirk by Major-General The Hon. Harold Alexander, commanding the 1st Division. His performance there was undistinguished; according to Alan Brooke commanding II Corps he suffered a nervous breakdown; he was overwrought with work (and was) impossible to deal with.

His then-subordinate, Bernard Montgomery, remarked that "only a madman would give a corps to Barker." His active military service was finished, and he served for a year as head of Aldershot Command before retiring from the army later that year.

Barker died in 1960, aged 75, in Colchester, Essex.

Personal life
Barker married Barbara Maude Bentall in Essex in October 1914. He was the father of Michael John Eustace Barker (1915–1995) who became, among other things, a merchant sailor, and who was, allegedly, the lover of Stephen Spender and, later, W. H. Auden for a time during World War II. "Jack", as he was known, wrote an autobiography, "No Moaning There!", published in 1962.

References

Bibliography

External links
British Army Officers 1939−1945
Generals of World War II

|-

|-
 

|-
 

1884 births
1960 deaths
British Army generals of World War I
British Army generals of World War II
British Army personnel of the Second Boer War
British military personnel of the 1936–1939 Arab revolt in Palestine
Companions of the Distinguished Service Order
Companions of the Order of the Bath
Deputy Lieutenants of Essex
East Surrey Regiment officers
Graduates of the Staff College, Camberley
Officiers of the Légion d'honneur
People educated at Malvern College
People from Wells, Somerset
Royal Lincolnshire Regiment officers
York and Lancaster Regiment officers
British Army lieutenant generals
Military personnel from Somerset